Fame on Fire is an American rock band from Palm Beach, Florida, United States.

History
The band was formed by current members in 2013, and started out as a cover band, releasing metal covers for songs by famous artists such as Lil Uzi Vert, Ed Sheeran, Juice Wrld, The Weeknd, Halsey, and others. They received recognition in 2015, after releasing a cover of Adele's song, "Hello". In 2017, they released the EP Transitions, containing five original songs. In 2020 they released their debut studio album, Levels. The song "Her Eyes" reached number one on Sirius XM Octane. They released their second LP, Welcome to the Chaos, in 2022.

Members
Bryan Kuznitz - vocals
Blake Saul - guitar
Paul Spirou - bass
Alex Roman - drums

Discography

Studio albums
 Levels (2020)
 Welcome to the Chaos (2022)

Singles

References

Rap rock groups
Musical groups from Florida
Musical groups established in 2013
Arena rock musical groups
Metalcore musical groups from Florida